Croceitalea litorea is a Gram-negative, rod-shaped and non-motile bacterium from the genus of Croceitalea which has been isolated from seashore sand from the Jeju Island in Korea.

References

Flavobacteria
Bacteria described in 2015